Toby Finn Regbo (born 18 October 1991) is an English actor who has appeared in film, television and theatre.

Early life
Toby Regbo was born in Hammersmith, London, England. His father's family is of Norwegian origin. His maternal grandfather was an Italian cruise ship captain, and his maternal grandmother was an Australian ballerina; his mother was brought up in London.

He attended Latymer Upper School in West London.
His interest in acting started with plays at school; later on, he attended Young Blood Theatre Company.

Career

Regbo started his acting career with a small role in 2006 ITV television film Sharpe's Challenge. In 2007, he played American teen spy Chad Turner in an episode of CBBC children's spy-fi adventure series M.I. High. He continued to pursue his acting career in 2009, when he played Michael Walton in Stephen Poliakoff's period drama Glorious 39. One of his most notable roles was in a science fiction drama Mr. Nobody, premiered in 2009. He played eponymous character Nemo Nobody (in his teenage years). He also played young Albus Dumbledore in the film Harry Potter and the Deathly Hallows – Part 1 and reprised the role in the 2018 film Fantastic Beasts: The Crimes of Grindelwald. He made his stage début as Eliot in Tusk Tusk, a 2009 play by Polly Stenham, at the Royal Court Theatre in London.

Regbo played James Sveck in the film version of Peter Cameron's novel Someday This Pain Will Be Useful To You, shot in the summer 2010 in New York. In 2013, Regbo played John in drama-thriller film uwantme2killhim? directed by Andrew Douglas and produced by Bryan Singer. He was originally cast in Disney's Maleficent as young Stefan, but was ultimately replaced by Michael Higgins as the directors decided they wanted a younger boy to play the part. He starred in The CW's original show Reign as Francis II of France. In 2016, he played Æthelred on BBC Two UK's series The Last Kingdom.

Regbo was set to be part of the cast of the upcoming Game of Thrones prequel titled "Bloodmoon" but the pilot did not get picked up.

Critical reception

Mr. Nobody
Film critic Eric Lavallée listed Regbo as one of his "Top 10 New Faces & Voices" of 2009 Toronto International Film Festival. He noted that "newbie Toby Regbo might easily be Mr. Nobody's most 'alive' character. Playing Nemo at age 16, the actor is mostly paired with Juno Temple - their unique love story is the film's heart pumping portions and plays a lot better than the artery clogging other brushes of romance." Varietys Boyd van Hoeij praised Regbo and Temple as well, saying "Regbo, as the teenage Nemo, and Juno Temple, as the teenage Anna, are impressive, bringing the hormonal battles of adolescence vividly to life".

Tusk Tusk
His portrayal of Eliot in Tusk Tusk received praise from a broad spectrum of theatre critics. Michael Billington from The Guardian called him an "astonishing actor". Robert Tanitch from Morning Star praised both his and co-star Bel Powley's "impressive performances" and predicted that "Tusk Tusk should, all things being equal, play to full houses because of them". Matt Wolf, writing for The New York Times, was also very complimentary about the pair, concluding: "... these newfound talents inhabit every mercurial point on a spectrum that makes them one another's protectors and their destroyers, enemies and allies. Will you be more shaken by Ms. Powley ..., or Mr. Regbo, whose face is chillingly capable of shutting down? It's difficult to say, though one thing is clear: Tusk Tusk is beyond tears in a production beyond praise."

Uwantme2killhim? (Also known as U Want Me 2 Kill Him?)
Critical reception for uwantme2killhim? produced by Bryan Singer, typically centered upon Regbo and his co-star Jamie Blackley's acting, with the Screen Daily commenting that the two delivered "strong performances". Variety praised his performance commenting "The impressive Regbo is on surer footing as a meek geek with some surreptitious social skills". Maitland McDonagh, from Film Journal International, also complimented the duo noting "Stars Blackley and Regbo are the film's core strength, despite long scenes in which they speak aloud what they're typing into their computers that would tax the skills of many older and more experienced actors".

The film premiered at the Edinburgh International Film Festival, where the two actors won the "Best performance in a British feature film" award.

Filmography

Film

Television

Theatre

Video games

Awards and nominations

Notes

External links

 
 Toby Regbo on Instagram @tobyregbo
 

1991 births
21st-century English male actors
English male child actors
English male film actors
English male stage actors
English male television actors
English people of Australian descent
English people of Italian descent
English people of Norwegian descent
Living people
Male actors from London
People educated at Latymer Upper School